In geometry of five dimensions or higher, a cantic 5-cube, cantihalf 5-cube, truncated 5-demicube is a uniform 5-polytope, being a truncation of the 5-demicube. It has half the vertices of a cantellated 5-cube.

Cartesian coordinates 
The Cartesian coordinates for the 160 vertices of a cantic 5-cube centered at the origin and edge length 6 are coordinate permutations:
 (±1,±1,±3,±3,±3)
with an odd number of plus signs.

Alternate names 
 Cantic penteract, truncated demipenteract
 Truncated hemipenteract (thin) (Jonathan Bowers)

Images

Related polytopes 
It has half the vertices of the cantellated 5-cube, as compared here in the B5 Coxeter plane projections:

This polytope is based on the 5-demicube, a part of a dimensional family of uniform polytopes called demihypercubes for being alternation of the hypercube family.

There are 23 uniform 5-polytope that can be constructed from the D5 symmetry of the 5-demicube, of which are unique to this family, and 15 are shared within the 5-cube family.

Notes

References 
 H.S.M. Coxeter: 
 H.S.M. Coxeter, Regular Polytopes, 3rd Edition, Dover New York, 1973 
 Kaleidoscopes: Selected Writings of H.S.M. Coxeter, edited by F. Arthur Sherk, Peter McMullen, Anthony C. Thompson, Asia Ivic Weiss, Wiley-Interscience Publication, 1995,  
 (Paper 22) H.S.M. Coxeter, Regular and Semi Regular Polytopes I, [Math. Zeit. 46 (1940) 380-407, MR 2,10]
 (Paper 23) H.S.M. Coxeter, Regular and Semi-Regular Polytopes II, [Math. Zeit. 188 (1985) 559-591]
 (Paper 24) H.S.M. Coxeter, Regular and Semi-Regular Polytopes III, [Math. Zeit. 200 (1988) 3-45]
 Norman Johnson Uniform Polytopes, Manuscript (1991)
 N.W. Johnson: The Theory of Uniform Polytopes and Honeycombs, Ph.D.

External links 
 
 Polytopes of Various Dimensions
 Multi-dimensional Glossary

5-polytopes